Edward Mallory (born Edward Ralph Martz; June 14, 1930 – April 4, 2007) was an American actor, best known for his role as Dr. Bill Horton on the soap opera Days of Our Lives, which he played from 1966 to 1980.

Mallory once was married to actress Joyce Bulifant, with whom he had one child, John Mallory Asher, and was married to Susanne Zenor at the time of his death; Zenor played Margo Horton on Days of Our Lives. Mallory, a 1958 graduate of the Drama Department of Carnegie Mellon University, was an artist in residence at Frostburg State University.

Ed Mallory also taught a video and speech performance class. He can be seen as the Thief in The Alfred Hitchcock Hour episode "Ten Minutes from Now".

Filmography

Notes

References

External links

1930 births
2007 deaths
American male soap opera actors
American male film actors
Male actors from Maryland
Male actors from Pennsylvania
Actors from Cumberland, Maryland
20th-century American male actors